Out of the Black is 2012 studio album by German electronic music artist Boys Noize. It was named by Spin as one of the 20 best dance albums of 2012.

Track listing

Charts

References

External links
 

2012 albums
Boys Noize albums